Schytts is a Swedish dansband, established in 1962 as Public Killers before changing their name the upcoming year. The name Schytts was taken from their founding drummer Yngve Schytt. Their major breakthrough came in 1973, with the song "Aj, aj, aj", which appeared on their debut studio album Hålligång 1, released the same year.

Discography

Albums
Hålligång 1 -  1973
Hålligång 2 -  1974
Hålligång 3 -  1974
Hålligång 4 -  1975
Hålligång 5 -  1975
Hålligång 6 -  1976
Änglalåtar -  1976
Hålligång 7 - Disco Lady -  1977
VM-skivan -  1978
Hålligång 8 - Rock'n'roll -  1979
Nya änglalåtar -  1979
Vi ska ha fest -  1980
Greatest Hits -  1980
Bullfest -  1984
Hålligång 11 - samling vid pumpen -  1985
Hålligång 12 - Tid för lite äventyr -  1987
Jubileumsdans samlingsplatta -  1989
Danshålligång 14 - Mitt hjärtas hamn -  1990
Hålligång 15 - De' e' la' gôtt -  1991
Musikparaden - 1992
Aj, aj, aj - 1993
16 - 1995
Hålligång 20 bästa - 1997
En ängel i mitt hus - 1998
Ett fenomen - 1998
Guldkorn - 2001
Nya änglahits - 2002 (with Bhonus)

Singles
Ingen har älskat så - 1999
Kom tätt intill, dansa nära - 2000
Solregn - 2001
I ett nattåg söderut - 2001
Det finns tid - 2002
Ta mig ända hem - 2003
En dag, en natt med dig - 2005
Ta med dig allting när du går - 2006
Linda sa - 2007
På G igen - 2008

Svensktoppen songs
 Aj, aj, aj (1973)
 En annan stad, en annan vän (1974)
 Tala om vart du ska resa (1974)
 Hasta La Vista (1974)
 Hasta Manana (1974)
 Na Na Na (1974)
 En spännande dag för Josefine (1974)
 Emma (1975)
 Låt oss träffas på stranden (1975)
 Om och om och om och om igen (1975)
 Don Carlo dansar (1976)
 Disco Lady (1977)
 Tingelingeling (1977)
 Ge mig mera (1978)
 Vi gör så gott vi kan (1978)
 Kommer du ihåg Babylon (1978)
 Du är som en sommardag (1979)
 Jamaica farväl (1979)
 Sol, öar, vind och hav (1980)
 Copenhagen (1981)
 Oh la la, fyra dar i Paris (1988)
 Dé é lá gôtt (1993)
 Allt finns kvar hos dig (1996)
 En ängel i mitt hus (1997)
 Natten tänder sina ljus (1998)
 Ingen har älskat så (2000)
 Ett fenomen (2000)
 Kom tätt intill, dansa nära (2001)
 Ett nattåg söderut (2002)
 Det fanns en tid (2002)

References

External links
Official website

1962 establishments in Sweden
Dansbands
Musical groups established in 1962
Musical groups from Gothenburg